Diplomacy is a 1994 book written by former United States National Security Advisor and Secretary of State Henry Kissinger.

Summary 
It is a sweep of the history of international relations and the art of diplomacy that largely concentrates on the 20th century and the Western World. Kissinger, as a great believer in the realist school (realism) of international relations, focuses strongly upon the concepts of the balance of power in Europe prior to World War I, raison d'État and Realpolitik throughout the ages of diplomatic relations. Kissinger also provides critiques of the counter realist diplomatic tactics of collective security, which was developed in the Charter of the League of Nations, and self-determination, which was also a principle of the League. Kissinger also examines the use of the sphere of influence arguments put forth by the Soviet Union in Eastern and Southern Europe after World War II, an argument that has been maintained by contemporary Russian foreign relations with regard to Ukraine, Georgia and other former Soviet satellites in Central Asia.

The history begins in Europe in the 17th century but quickly advances up to the World Wars and then the Cold War. Kissinger refers to himself numerous times in the book, especially when he recounts the Richard Nixon and Gerald Ford presidencies. The book ends with the argument that the US after the Cold War world should return to European style realpolitik and abandon Wilsonian idealism for it is a must if America is willing to survive - they must adhere to tough choices which conforms to the reality of the situation, not some sort of grasping the situation that they are in with a touch of utopic vision. But he cautioned that the realpolitik is not some sort of an automatic 'cure-all' for all the diplomatic or political feuds

Kissinger dedicated the book to the men and women of the United States Foreign Service.

Praise
In a New York Times review the books was likened to Machiavelli's classic 'Discourses' and predicted that in future it will be read, like Machiavelli's book, "for its wisdom".

Criticism
The book has been target of criticism for historical inaccuracies.

Chapters
The New World Order
The Hinge: Theodore Roosevelt or Woodrow Wilson
From Universality to Equilibrium: Richelieu, William of Orange, and Pitt
The Concert of Europe: Great Britain, Austria, and Russia
Two Revolutionaries: Napoleon III and Bismarck
Realpolitik Turns on Itself
A Political Doomsday Machine: European Diplomacy Before the First World War
Into the Vortex: The Military Doomsday Machine
The New Face of Diplomacy: Wilson and the Treaty of Versailles
The Dilemmas of the Victors
Stresemann and the Re-emergence of the Vanquished
The End of Illusion: Hitler and the Destruction of Versailles
Stalin's Bazaar
The Nazi-Soviet Pact
America Re-enters the Arena: Franklin Delano Roosevelt
Three Approaches to Peace: Roosevelt, Stalin, and Churchill in World War II
The Beginning of the Cold War
The Success and the Pain of Containment
The Dilemma of Containment: The Korean War
Negotiating with the Communists: Adenauer, Churchill, and Eisenhower
Leapfrogging Containment: The Suez Crisis
Hungary: Upheaval in the Empire
Khrushchev's Ultimatum: The Berlin Crisis 1958-63
Concepts of Western Unity: Macmillan, de Gaulle, Eisenhower, and Kennedy
Vietnam: Entry into the Morass; Truman and Eisenhower
Vietnam: On the Road to Despair; Kennedy, and Johnson
Vietnam: The Extrication; Nixon
Foreign Policy as Geopolitics: Nixon's Triangular Diplomacy
Détente and Its Discontents
The End of the Cold War: Reagan and Gorbachev
The New World Order Reconsidered

A leather-bound, gold-embossed edition of the book was published by the Easton Press and signed by Kissinger.

The book appears in the film Muppet Treasure Island, in which The Great Gonzo pulls it out of Billy Bones' sea chest.

References

Kissinger, Henry. Diplomacy. New York: Simon & Schuster, 1994. 

1994 non-fiction books
Non-fiction books about diplomacy
Books about foreign relations of the United States
Books about geopolitics
Books by Henry Kissinger
Simon & Schuster books